Title Shot is a Canadian crime drama film, directed by Les Rose and released in 1979. Rose's second collaboration with writer and actor Richard Gabourie following 1978's Three Card Monte, the film stars Gabourie as Blake, a police detective in Toronto who is investigating an attempt by crime boss Frank Renzetti (Tony Curtis) to rig the outcome of boxing matches.

The film premiered at the 1979 Festival of Festivals.

The film was more poorly received by critics than Three Card Monte. Jay Scott of The Globe and Mail wrote that "by the time the climax has rolled around, there have been a number of good performances (Susan Hogan, Jack Duffy, Taborah Johnson, Sean McCann) and many demonstrations of first-rate composition, rhythm and editing. But there have also been continuity and emphasis miscalculations — a strike at Curtis' bakery is introduced and then dropped, and the movie rushes by Curtis' fate (he's flamboyantly sleazy enough to care about) in favour of letting Gabourie twinkle his way into a big-star farewell. It took years for Jack Nicholson to reach the audience-patting excess of Goin' South; Gabourie has turned into the actor's version of a used car salesman after two movies." In his 2003 book A Century of Canadian Cinema, Gerald Pratley described the film as disappointing, boring and filled with unlikable characters.

References

External links

1979 films
Canadian crime drama films
English-language Canadian films
Films scored by Paul Zaza
Films set in Toronto
Films shot in Toronto
Canadian boxing films
Films directed by Les Rose
1979 crime drama films
1970s English-language films
1970s Canadian films